"Boyz N the Highlands" is the 13th episode of the 33rd season of the American animated television series The Simpsons, and the 719th episode overall. It aired in the United States on Fox on March 6, 2022. The episode was directed by Bob Anderson and written by Dan Vebber. The plot is inspired by the 2019 movie Get Duked!.

Plot

When juvenile court sends Bart Simpson, Martin Prince, Nelson Muntz, and Dolph Shapiro on a wilderness trek together they end up rescuing a baby goat from a trio of Satanists who then begin hunting the kids to get their goat back. Meanwhile, Lisa Simpson takes advantage of Bart's absence to make Homer Simpson and Marge Simpson lavish attention on her as if she were an only child.

Reception
Tony Sokol of Den of Geek gave the episode a 3.5 out of 5 stars stating, "The Simpsons benefit from turning Bart and the secondary characters into a troupe. Each gets time to shine, the interactions become layered. With limited scenarios and no lords of these flies, the story is a mishmash of sources all with soft landings. The best redemption comes at the end, with a comically visual representation of how, in spite of all the good intentions, nothing at the Simpson house has changed at all. Lisa is more content, but Bart discovered new freedom from the wilds, and Homer may never scrape Snowball III off his face. “Boyz N the Highlands” skips the path less taken to reinforce the new direction, but loses footing along the way."

Marcus Gibson of Bubbleblabber gave the episode a 7 out of 10 stating, "Overall, “Boyz N the Highlands” is another wilderness trip that’s as dangerous and fun as being chased by a satanist cult. It doesn’t quite match what Homer and Marge went through in their trek through the great outdoors regarding its plot. However, its humor involving Martin and Lisa being the “only child” is enough to make this latest adventure in the wild more enjoyable than spending our endless days in front of our screens."

In its original broadcast, the episode was watched by 1.53 million viewers and was the highest-rated show on Animation Domination that night.

References

External links
 

2022 American television episodes
The Simpsons (season 33) episodes
Television episodes about organized crime
Television episodes about Satanism